Lee Ethel Stecklein (born April 23, 1994) is an American ice hockey defenseman and member of the  US national team, currently playing in the Professional Women's Hockey Players Association (PWHPA) with Team Harvey's. She has represented the United States at the Winter Olympic Games in the 2014,  2018 and 2022. Her college ice hockey career was played with the Minnesota Golden Gophers women's ice hockey program.

Stecklein was selected second overall by the Buffalo Beauts in the 2016 NWHL Draft.

Playing career

NCAA
Stecklein played in all 41 games of her freshman season (2012–13) at Minnesota, tallying three goals and nine assists.

USA Hockey
Stecklein made her senior national team debut at the 2013 4 Nations Cup and, later in that season, won a gold medal at the 2013 IIHF Women's World Championship. She represented Team USA at the IIHF Women's World Championship in 2015, 2016, 2017, 2019, 2021, and 2022, and the 2014, 2018, and 2022 Winter Olympics.

NWHL

On June 20, 2018, Stecklein signed with the Minnesota Whitecaps, for their inaugural season as members of the National Women's Hockey League (NWHL). Along with Shannon Szabados, Stecklein was named one of the team captains for the 4th NWHL All-Star Game. Stecklein scored the game-winning goal to cinch the 2019 Isobel Cup victory.

Personal life 
Stecklein is from Roseville, Minnesota and attended Roseville Area High School.

She graduated from the Carlson School of Management at the University of Minnesota with a BBA in entrepreneurial management in 2017. She has been employed as a digital content specialist at Clif Bar since 2018.

Career statistics

Regular season and playoffs

International

Sources:

Awards and honors

Weekly awards 
WCHA Defensive Player of the Week
 Week of October 7, 2014
 Week of January 31, 2017

WCHA Rookie of the Week
 Week of November 28, 2012

References

External links
 
 
 

1994 births
Living people
American women's ice hockey defensemen
Ice hockey players from Minnesota
Ice hockey players at the 2014 Winter Olympics
Ice hockey players at the 2018 Winter Olympics
Ice hockey players at the 2022 Winter Olympics
Medalists at the 2014 Winter Olympics
Medalists at the 2018 Winter Olympics
Medalists at the 2022 Winter Olympics
Minnesota Golden Gophers women's ice hockey players
Minnesota Whitecaps players
Olympic gold medalists for the United States in ice hockey
Olympic silver medalists for the United States in ice hockey
People from Roseville, Minnesota
People from South St. Paul, Minnesota
Professional Women's Hockey Players Association players
Roseville Area High School alumni